Panzer-Abteilung 211 was a tank battalion of the German army during World War II. The battalion fought during Operation Silver Fox which was a combined German and Finnish offensive attempting to capture the Soviet port of Murmansk. The unit was disbanded after this operation due to their outdated equipment.

Formation
After the fall of France in June 1940 the Germans captured a large amount of French vehicles. Among those were 297 (varying according to sources) Somua S35 which was considered by many to be the premier medium tank at the beginning of the war. In addition to the SOMUA S35s there were around 550 Hotchkiss H35 and H38 tanks captured as well. The Germans used these captured vehicles to equip several smaller units which were then combined into Panzer-Abteilung 211 on 22 March 1941.

Operation Silver Fox
The Soviet port of Murmansk was a high-value target for German command in 1941. On 27 June 1941 they began Operation Silver Fox to capture the key port,  Panzer-Abteilung 211 was tasked with supporting the combined German and Finnish force along with Panzer-Abteilung 40 which was equipped with Panzer I and Panzer II tanks. This force would participate in a sub-operation of Operation Silver Fox code-named Operation Arctic Fox which was a campaign against Soviet Northern Front defenses at Salla, Finland in July 1941. The offensive launched on 1 July 1941 ended on 17 November in a stalemate with German and Finnish forces advancing but not being able to capture Murmansk nor the railway at Kandalaksha.

Sources

Military units and formations of the German Army in World War II
Military units and formations established in 1941
Armoured units and formations of Germany
Military units and formations disestablished in 1941